The first impeachment process against Pedro Pablo Kuczynski, then the incumbent President of Peru since 2016, was initiated by the Congress of Peru on 15 December 2017. According to Luis Galarreta, the President of the Congress, the whole process of impeachment could have taken as little as a week to complete. This event was part of the second stage of the political crisis generated by the confrontation between the Government of Pedro Pablo Kuczynski and the Congress, in which the opposition Popular Force had an absolute majority.

The impeachment request was rejected by the congress on 21 December 2017, for failing to obtain sufficient votes for the deposition.

Background

Prior to the beginning of the process to remove him from office, President Kuczynski was accused by the congressional opposition of lying about receiving bribes from the Brazilian construction company Odebrecht, as he had initially denied receiving any payments at all from the them, but later admitted that he had in fact been receiving payments to a firm he owned, Westfield Capital Ltd, while continuing to deny any irregularities in those payments. A number of other Latin American politicians had previously also been implicated in similar accusations of part-taking in financial irregularities involving Odebrecht, including Colombian president Juan Manuel Santos, Mexican president Enrique Peña Nieto, Venezuelan president Nicolás Maduro, former Peruvian presidents Alan García, Alejandro Toledo and Ollanta Humala, as well as Keiko Fujimori, chairwoman of the party Popular Force and daughter of the former president Alberto Fujimori, and whom Kuczynski had narrowly defeated in the 2016 general election.

Upon the initiation of impeachment proceedings Congress president Luis Galarreta stated that he expected Kuczynski to be removed from office ″within a week″, as Kuczynski's Peruvians for Change party occupies only 18 of the 130 seats in Congress, while the opposition right-wing Popular Force (which is chaired by Keiko Fujimori) and left-wing Broad Front (headed by a former priest and environmental activist called Marco Arana), both in favor of Kuczynski's removal, together command 81 of the necessary two-thirds congressional majority (87 seats) needed to remove a president from office. According to reports by the Reuters news agency, Kuczynski had also lost the support of his own cabinet members, who had begun to urge him to resign as well. On 14 December 2017 he was also given an ultimatum by the congressional opposition to resign by the end of the day or face impeachment in Congress, to which he responded by saying: "It cost us a lot to get our democracy back. We're not going to lose it again. I'm not going to give up my honour, nor my values, nor my responsibilities as president of all Peruvians."

Vote in the Congress of the Republic

Partisan makeup of the Congress of the Republic (16 December 2017)

See also
 President of Peru
 Congress of Peru
 Impeachment trial
 List of impeachments of heads of state
 Alberto Fujimori
 Second impeachment and resignation of Pedro Pablo Kuczynski
 First impeachment process against Martín Vizcarra
 Removal of Martín Vizcarra

References

2017 in Peru
2017 in politics
Impeachment in Peru
Political history of Peru
December 2017 events in South America
Pedro Pablo Kuczynski
Kuczynski, Pedro Pablo